

History 
Formed in 1996 in Denver, CO. from Ross Kersten 
The La Donnas have toured extensively in the U.S.A. and most of Europe with great success. They have shared the stage with: Nashville Pussy, The Bellrays, New Bomb Turks, Gaza Strippers, Zeke, etc., after the band is disbanded on 2001 Ross Kersten founded The Mochines.

Discography 
Albums
 1996 — Shady Lane
 1998 — Rock You All Night Long
 2001 — Complicated Fun

EP
 1995 — LaDonnaland

7"
 1995 — Long Legs/Counter Unload
 1997 — Invasion/End of the Devil Dogs
 1999 — Pick Up Your Soul / Heaven Sent / Who's Who of Love

Various Artists
 1997 — The Thing From Another World "Your Last Chance to Rock 'n' Roll Baby!"
 1998 — Ox-Compilation No. 32 - PANK!

Note 
 [ The La Donnas AllMusic]

External links 
  fan page MySpace
  Official MySpace

Musical groups established in 1996
Punk rock groups from Colorado
Musical groups from Denver
1996 establishments in Colorado